The Urban Forestry Center is a  state-owned forest and environmental education center in the city of Portsmouth, New Hampshire. There are several buildings, garden demonstration areas, and trails which are used for walking, cross-country skiing, and snowshoeing.

The Center is used as a tree farm and forestry education center. The property includes a  forest management area, a red pine and a spruce plantation, and an arboretum  for tree identification. There are self-guided trails through the woodlands systems.

References

External links

Urban Forestry Center at New Hampshire Division of Forests and Lands

Protected areas of New Hampshire
Protected areas of Rockingham County, New Hampshire
Portsmouth, New Hampshire
New Hampshire state forests
Education in Rockingham County, New Hampshire
Tourist attractions in Portsmouth, New Hampshire